Dhulli is a village of Tehsil & District Talagang   in the Punjab province of Pakistan. It lies 25 km south-west of the town of Talagang on the Talagang-Mianwali road, and is 50 km from Motorway M-2 'Bulkasar Interchange.

Despite having status of a village, the settlement is pretty large, with the population close to 3,500 people, two large post offices, a few schools and a great number of mosques. The local community is very religious and traditional. The lifestyle is still based on the caste system.

Geographic Information

Nearby airports 
The nearest airports to Dhulli are:

Schools 
 Government High School Dhulli (boys)
 Government Secondary School Dhulli (girls)
 Minhaj Public School Dhulli (private)
 Sir Syed Ideal School Dhulli English Medium (private)
 Govt Muktab School Dhulli

Mosques 
 Jam-e-Masjid Kadhay Wali (oldest mosque in the village)
 Jam-e-Masjid Darbal
 Masjid Mohalla Ghaziabad and Faisal Colony
 Jam-e-masjid Darbar sharif
 Jam-e-Masjid Ladhwal (old name is Toot Wali)
 Jam-e-Masjid Chishtia (previously Masjid Khansal)
 Jame-e-Masjid Mochi Wali (Munara Wali Masjid)
 Jame-e-Masjid Awasia (Adday Wali Masjid)
 Masjid Kabristan Wali jamia ashat ul quran
 Jame-e-Masjid toot wali

Major castes 
The following are the major castes of Dhulli:

Darbal
Fateh Khanal
 Mherkhnal
 Khansal
 Khannal
 Qutbal
 Ishral
 Ladhwal
 Kulyal
 Tural
 Roshnal
 Jindwal
 Imral

Dhokes (sub-villages) 
Following are the dhokes of Dhulli:
 Dhoke Summandri 
 Dhoke Chhoee
 Dhoke Bhirra
 Dhoke Burrala 
 Dhoke Pindian
 Dhoke Barrimala
 Dhoke Modimaar
 Dhoke sohlewali
 Dhoke Nakka
 Dhoke Nari
 Dhoke Goje wali (Malik Mohammad Hanif)
 Dhoke Padhi near alfalah ground
 Dhoke Khatti 
 Dhoke chaphr 
 Dhoke Wanhar
 Dhoke Shamial

References 

http://www.geonames.org/maps/google_32.863_72.194.html
http://www.fallingrain.com/world/PK/04/Dhulli.html
http://www.latlong.net/place/dhulli-punjab-pakistan-12904.html

Chakwal District